FACT complex subunit SPT16 is a protein that in humans is encoded by the SUPT16H gene.

Function 

Transcription of protein-coding genes can be reconstituted on naked DNA with only the general transcription factors and RNA polymerase II. However, this minimal system cannot transcribe DNA packaged into chromatin, indicating that accessory factors may facilitate access to DNA. One such factor, FACT (facilitates chromatin transcription), interacts specifically with histones H2A/H2B to effect nucleosome disassembly and transcription elongation. FACT is composed of an 80 kDa subunit and a 140 kDa subunit, the latter of which is the protein encoded by this gene.

Interactions 

SUPT16H has been shown to interact with BAZ1B.

References

Further reading

External links